Lana Greenfield (born January 30, 1951) is an American politician. She has served as a Republican member for the 2nd district in the South Dakota House of Representatives since 2015.

Election history

2020 Greenfield was re-elected by receiving 6,428 votes along with Kaleb Weis who received 6,381 votes.
2018 Greenfield was re-elected by receiving 5,673 along with Kaleb Weis who received 4,821 votes, they defeated Democratic candidates Jenae Hansen who received 3,856 votes and Mike McHugh who received 3,060 votes.
2016 Greenfield was re-elected by receiving 6,225 votes along with Burt Tulson who received 6,220 votes, they defeated Democratic candidate John Graham who received 3,673 votes.

References

1951 births
Living people
People from Watertown, South Dakota
Educators from South Dakota
American women educators
Women state legislators in South Dakota
Republican Party members of the South Dakota House of Representatives
21st-century American politicians
21st-century American women politicians
People from Doland, South Dakota